Kathleen Margaret Macpherson née Walker (1913 – 19 August 1999) was a Canadian feminist known for her views on nuclear disarmament, as well as being banned from the United States of America for her views.

Early life 
Macpherson was born in Uxbridge, England in 1913. After her father died in 1917, the family moved to Branksome. There, Macpherson's mother remarried in 1920 and the family moved to Bedford. Her mother passed away in 1933.

Career 
After completing school in 1932, she began training in physiotherapy at St. Thomas' Hospital and completed her training in 1934. She moved to Montreal, Canada in 1935 to work as a physiotherapist after working five months in Selly Oak. Her activism began in the 1950s with her work with the Association of Women Electors in Toronto. In 1960, Macpherson was a founding member of the Canadian Voice of Women for Peace, serving as president for a number of years. On behalf of the organization, she took a trip to Hanoi to voice opposition to the Vietnam War and arranged for Vietnamese women to visit Canada. In 1971, Macpherson was one of the founding members of the National Action Committee on the Status of Women; she also served them as president from 1977 to 1979. She was also one of the founders of Women for Political Action. She unsuccessfully ran for election in the York East federal elections in 1972, 1974 and 1980. In 1982, Macpherson was named a member of the Order of Canada.

Personal life 
In 1941, Macpherson moved to Fredericton, New Brunswick and met political scientist C.B. Macpherson the following year while he was teaching at the University of New Brunswick. In 1943, they married and later had three children, Susan, Stephen, and Shiela.

Death 
Machpherson passed away on 19 August 1999 after suffering from cancer.

References 

1913 births
1999 deaths
Canadian women
Canadian feminists
Canadian feminist writers
English women
English feminist writers
English feminists